The Pigmy Pouter is a breed of fancy pigeon developed over many years of selective breeding. Pigmy Pouters, along with other varieties of domesticated pigeons, are all descendants from the rock pigeon (Columba livia).

Noted British poultry breeder Sir John Sebright (who later bred the Sebright Bantam) is believed to have first bred the Pigmy Pouter, though the issue is debatable.

North American reception
Although the pigmy pouter has been heralded as a bizarre creature and its popularity has not increased much from its introduction to North American society, it still has a dedicated fanbase gathered together by groups such as the American Pigmy Pouter Club and The Canadian Pouter and Cropper Combine. Its low popularity makes obtaining such a bird a difficult task in North America. However, dedicated breeders have been striving to increase the bird's popularity and make it the most prevalent show bird.

See also 
Pouter
List of pigeon breeds

References

Pigeon breeds
Pigeon breeds originating in England